Poraster superbus is a species of sea stars in the family Oreasteridae. It is the sole species in the genus Poraster.

References

Oreasteridae
Monotypic echinoderm genera
Asteroidea genera
Taxa named by Ludwig Heinrich Philipp Döderlein